Queen of the Desert may refer to:

Queen of the Desert (film), biographical drama film about Gertrude Bell by Werner Herzog
The Adventures of Priscilla, Queen of the Desert, a 1994 Australian film by Stephan Elliott
Priscilla, Queen of the Desert (musical), a musical adapted from the 1994 film of same name by Stephan Elliott and Allan Scott